Eisler is a Jewish surname of German origin that may refer to:
 Barry Eisler, American novelist
 Brenda Eisler, Canadian long jumper
 Georg Eisler, Austrian painter
 Gerhart Eisler, German journalist and politician
 Hanns Eisler, Austrian composer
 Jerzy Eisler, Polish historian
 Kim Isaac Eisler, American author
 Lloyd Eisler, Canadian figure skater
 Paul Eisler, Austrian engineer
 Riane Eisler, American sociologist
 Robert Eisler, Austrian Jewish art historian and Biblical scholar

See also
 Edmund Eysler 
 Eisner

Jewish surnames
Surnames of German origin